The Virginians (also known as the Richmond Virginians) is a barbershop chorus located in Richmond, Virginia. Mike Wallen is currently its musical director, and has been serving in this capacity since 1998. It recently celebrated its 50th anniversary and is one of the oldest continuous singing groups in the Greater Richmond Area. Originally chartered in 1952 as the Tobaccoland Chorus, the chapter was renamed to the Virginians in 1990.

The Virginians competed at the 2000 Barbershop Harmony Society International Competition, held at Kansas City, Missouri, numbering 100 on stage. That same year, it sponsored a major benefit performance (featuring the Richmond Symphony Orchestra) for the WRVA Alden Aaroe Shoe Fund at the Landmark Theater. The Virginians chorus was selected to participate at the seventh annual Russian Barbershop Music Festival with Greg Lyne, held in Saint Petersburg, Russia, in 2006.

Membership
The active members of the chorus draw primarily from the city of Richmond, Henrico, Hanover, Chesterfield and eastern Goochland counties. Some members come from as far away as Charlottesville and the Northern Neck, with a strong contingent from the Williamsburg area.

Activities
Annual performances typically include:
 Spring Show, which usually has a theme and a guest quartet or performing group
 Williamsburg Community Show
 Dogwood Dell Show (outdoor performance)
 Christmas Show
The Virginians chorus participates in numerous community appearances with diverse shows that may include performances by its registered chapter quartets. One of its biggest fundraisers is an annual Singing Valentines program.

Most of its repertoire is made up of barbershop arrangements, but the Virginians also sing in other a cappella styles.

Organization
The Virginians chorus is the principal performing group from the Richmond chapter of the Barbershop Harmony Society (based in Nashville) a 501(c)(3) nonprofit charity. It is partially supported by the Arts Council of Richmond.

In addition, the Virginians Ensemble is a daytime chorus (a subset of Richmond chapter members who can perform during the work day) that is very active in the community.

Early history
Originally "organized in the Fall of 1945" with 24 members of local quartets, the Richmond affiliate of SPEBSQSA received its official charter from the society on December 6, 1952, with "almost 40 members". Its Charter Party was attended by "approximately 150 persons". Dean Snyder from SPEBSQSA (and founding member of the Alexandria Harmonizers), presided at the ceremony to hand the charter to then chapter president, Dr. Ralph M. Roberts.

The Richmond affiliate started proceedings to get an official SPEBSQSA charter in September 1952 and open up its membership to men who wanted to sing in an ensemble chorus. Previously, the group had been entirely made up of barbershop quartets.

Album

Their Blue Skies album was recorded live at the University of Richmond's Modlin Center for the Performing Arts (Camp Theater). The album was released in April 2008.

Leadership
Past musical directors include Brian Whitehead, Jim Garber, Hardman Jones, Buddy Johns, John Glass, Hardman Jones, John Hohl, Charlie Bechtler and Gary Parker. Since 1998, the director is Mike Wallen.

References

External links
 
 Chorus Profile
 Arts Council of Richmond
 Chapter Entry in Mid-Atlantic District of the Barbershop Harmony Society.
 Down by the River, Richmond Times-Dispatch, June 3, 1999, Riverfront Opening Celebration

1952 establishments in Virginia
Barbershop Harmony Society choruses
Music of Richmond, Virginia
Musical groups established in 1952
Musical groups from Virginia
Vocal music